Big C is a chain of hypermarkets in Thailand and Vietnam.

Big C may also refer to:
 Cancer
 The Big C (TV series)
 "Big C" (fight song), a fight song of the University of California, Berkeley
 The Big "C", a giant concrete block "C" in the Berkeley Hills of California, United States
 Chris Hardwick, Comedian and host of the Nerdist Podcast
Big Cass, American professional wrestler

BIGC may refer to:
Bangladesh Institute of Glass and Ceramics, established in 1951
BigCommerce stock ticker

See also
 Great Big Sea, a Canadian folk-rock band
 Small-C, a subset of the C programming language